American television series with Asian leads/co-leads means a scripted American television series that features an actor of Asian ancestry as the series' leading actor portraying the series' protagonist or a main character. One of the earliest examples dates back to 1951 with Anna May Wong a classic Hollywood-era movie star with her TV show The Gallery of Madame Liu-Tsong. Typically, the characters portrayed are Asian American, although the actor or actress may sometimes be Canadian, British, or Australian.

List of television series

1950s
The Gallery of Madame Liu-Tsong (Protagonist portrayed by Anna May Wong)

1960s
The Green Hornet (1966) (Bruce Lee)
Hawaii Five-O (Ensemble cast with Kam Fong, Gilbert Lani Kauhi)
Star Trek (Ensemble cast with George Takei)
The Courtship of Eddie's Father, (Mrs. Livingston, the housekeeper, as portrayed by Miyoshi Umeki.)

1970sThe Amazing Chan and the Chan Clan (Protagonist portrayed by Keye Luke)Mr. T and Tina (Protagonist portrayed by Pat Morita)Kung Fu (Co-leading characters portrayed by Philip Ahn and Keye Luke, and multiple guest actors)Quincy, M.E. (Ensemble cast with Robert Ito)Barney Miller (Ensemble cast with Jack Soo)Happy Days (Ensemble cast with Pat Morita)

1980sOhara (Protagonist portrayed by Pat Morita)Sidekicks (Protagonist portrayed Ernie Reyes Jr.)21 Jump Street (Esemble cast with Dustin Nguyen playing one of the main characters)Gung Ho (Protagonist portrayed by Gedde Watanabe)Bring 'Em Back Alive (Ensemble cast with Clyde Kusatsu)Island Son (Ensemble cast with Clyde Kusatsu)

1990sSaved by the Bell (protagonist portrayed by Mark-Paul Gosselaar)All American Girl (Protagonist portrayed by Margaret Cho)Vanishing Son (Protagonist portrayed by Russell Wong)Martial Law (Protagonist portrayed by Sammo Hung)The Mystery Files of Shelby Woo (protagonist portrayed by Irene Ng)Mortal Kombat: Conquest (protagonist portrayed by Paolo Montalbán)Mighty Morphin Power Rangers (Ensemble co-lead played by Thuy Trang)ER (Ensemble co-lead played by Ming-Na Wen, Parminder Nagra)Star Trek: Voyager (co-lead played by Garrett Wang)The Burning Zone (Ensemble co-lead played by Tamlyn Tomita)The Single Guy (Ensemble cast with Ming-Na Wen)Space Rangers (Ensemble cast with Cary-Hiroyuki Tagawa)Nash Bridges (Ensemble cast with Cary-Hiroyuki Tagawa and Kelly Hu)Crusade (Ensemble cast with Daniel Dae Kim)Space: Above and Beyond (Ensemble cast with Joel de la Fuente)V.I.P. (Ensemble cast with Dustin Nguyen)

2000sBlack Sash (Protagonist portrayed by Russell Wong)Relic Hunter (Protagonist portrayed by Tia Carrere)American Dragon: Jake Long (Protagonist portrayed by Dante Basco)Avatar: The Last Airbender (Ensemble cast with Dante Basco and Mako)Jackie Chan Adventures (Protagonist portrayed by James Sie)Aliens in America (Co-Lead portrayed by Adhir Kalyan)Inconceivable (Protagonist portrayed by Ming-Na Wen)Cashmere Mafia (Ensemble co-lead portrayed by Lucy Liu)Aaron Stone (Protagonist portrayed by Tania Gunadi)Lipstick Jungle (Ensemble co-lead portrayed by Lindsay Price)Eastwick (Ensemble co-lead portrayed by Lindsay Price)Samurai Girl (Protagonist portrayed by Jamie Chung)The Life and Times of Juniper Lee (Protagonist portrayed by Lara Jill Miller)The Suite Life of Zack & Cody (Major starring character portrayed by Brenda Song)Lost (Ensemble co-leads played by Daniel Dae Kim, Yunjin Kim, Naveen Andrews, and Ken Leung)Grey's Anatomy (Ensemble co-lead played by Sandra Oh)The Big Bang Theory (co-lead played by Kunal Nayyar)Star Trek: Enterprise (co-lead played by Linda Park)Law and Order: SVU (series regular BD Wong)Glee (ensemble co-leads: Jenna Ushkowitz, Harry Shum, Jr., Darren Criss)Heroes (ensemble co-leads: Masi Oka, Sendhil Ramamurthy)FlashForward (Co-lead portrayed by John Cho)Battlestar Galactica (Ensemble co-lead played by Grace Park)Community (Ensemble cast with Danny Pudi and Ken Jeong)Stargate Universe (Ensemble cast with Ming-Na Wen)Vanished (Ensemble cast with Ming-Na Wen)Parks and Recreation (Ensemble cast with Aziz Ansari)Off Centre (Ensemble cast with John Cho)

2010sThe Walking Dead (Ensemble cast with Steven Yeun)The Magicians (Ensemble cast with Arjun Gupta and Summer Bishil)Miracle Workers (Ensemble co-leads played by Geraldine Viswanathan and Karan Soni)Marco Polo (Majority of cast is Asian)Champions (Ensemble co-leads played by Josie Totah and Mouzam Makkar)Once Upon a Time in Wonderland (Ensemble cast with Naveen Andrews)Jessie (Ensemble cast with Karan Brar)Bunk'd (Ensemble cast with Karan Brar and Nina Lu)Bizaardvark (Ensemble co-leads played by Madison Hu and Olivia Rodrigo)Coop & Cami Ask the World (Ensemble cast with Albert Tsai)Liv and Maddie (Ensemble cast with Tenzing Norgay Trainor)Descendants: Wicked World (Ensemble cast with Booboo Stewart and Dianne Doan)Iron Fist (Ensemble co-lead played by Jessica Henwick)The Defenders (Ensemble cast with Jessica Henwick and Élodie Yung)Powerless (Ensemble co-leads played by Vanessa Hudgens and Danny Pudi)Legion (Ensemble cast with Navid Negahban and Lauren Tsai)The Assassination of Gianni Versace: American Crime Story (Ensemble co-lead played by Darren Criss)Falling Skies (Ensemble cast with Moon Bloodgood and Peter Shinkoda)Warrior (Ensemble co-leads played by Andrew Koji, Olivia Cheng, Jason Tobin, Dianne Doan, Joe Taslim and Hoon Lee)The Terror: Infamy (Majority of cast is Asian)Wu Assassins (Majority of cast is Asian)Origin (Protagonist portrayed by Sen Mitsuji)The Good Place (Ensemble co-leads played by Manny Jacinto and Jameela Jamil)The Man in the High Castle (Ensemble co-leads played by Joel de la Fuente and Cary-Hiroyuki Tagawa)Killing Eve (Protagonist portrayed by Sandra Oh)Selfie (Protagonist portrayed by John Cho)Sunnyside (Ensemble co-leads played by Kal Penn, Joel Kim Booster, and Poppy Liu)Elementary (Protagonist portrayed by Lucy Liu)Hawaii Five-0 (Ensemble cast with Daniel Dae Kim, Grace Park, Masi Oka)Fresh Off the Boat (Ensemble co-leads played by Hudson Yang, Constance Wu, Randall Park, Forrest Wheeler, and Ian Chen)Nikita (Protagonist portrayed by Maggie Q)Marry Me (Protagonist portrayed by Lucy Liu)Outsourced (Majority of cast is Asian)Supah Ninjas (Protagonist portrayed by Ryan Potter)Sullivan & Son (Protagonist portrayed by Steve Byrne)Beauty & the Beast (Protagonist portrayed by Kristin Kreuk)The Mindy Project (Protagonist portrayed by Mindy Kaling)Twisted (Protagonist portrayed by Avan Jogia)The 100 (Ensemble co-lead portrayed by Bob Morley)Quantico (Protagonist portrayed by Priyanka Chopra)Dr. Ken (Protagonist portrayed by Ken Jeong)Master of None (Protagonist portrayed by Aziz Ansari)Into the Badlands (Protagonists portrayed by Daniel Wu and Aramis Knight)Brown Nation (Majority of the cast)Andi Mack (Protagonist portrayed by Peyton Elizabeth Lee)The Night Of (Protagonist portrayed by Riz Ahmed)I Feel Bad (Protagonist portrayed by Sarayu Blue)Fairly Legal (Protagonist played by Sarah Shahi) 
Good Witch (TV series) (Protagonist played by Catherine Bell)PEN15 (Protagonist portrayed by Maya Erskine)Agents of S.H.I.E.L.D. (Ensemble co-leads are portrayed by Chloe Bennet and Ming-Na Wen)
Alex, Inc. (Protagonist portrayed by Tiya Sircar)
Claws (Ensemble co-lead played by Karrueche Tran)Five Points (Protagonist portrayed by Hayley Kiyoko)
Ramy (TV series) (Ensemble co-lead played by Mohammed Amer, Hiam Abbass, Dave Merheje, May Calamawy, Laith Nakli)Runaways (Ensemble co-lead played by Lyrica Okano)Crazy Ex-Girlfriend (Ensemble co-lead played by Vincent Rodriguez III)Saturday Night Live (Featured cast member Bowen Yang)Mr. Robot (series regular BD Wong)Pretty Little Liars (co-lead Shay Mitchell, Janell Parrish)Modern Family (co-lead Aubrey Anderson-Emmons)13 Reasons Why (main role Ross Butler)Runaways (main role Lyrica Okano)Pair of Kings (Main role Kelsey Chow)9-1-1 (TV series) (Ensemble co-lead played by Kenneth Choi)Chicago Med (Ensemble co-lead played by Brian Tee)The Resident (TV series) (Ensemble co-lead played by Manish Dayal)The Good Doctor (TV series) (Ensemble co-lead played by Will Yun Lee)Titans (2018 TV series) (Ensemble co-lead played by Ryan Potter)The Night Shift (Ensemble cast with Ken Leung)Inhumans (Ensemble cast with Ken Leung)Silicon Valley (Ensemble cast with Kumail Nanjiani, Jimmy O. Yang)Go On (Ensemble cast with John Cho)The Exorcist (Ensemble cast with John Cho)Hemlock Grove (Ensemble cast with Joel de la Fuente)The Librarians (Ensemble cast with John Harlan Kim)

2020sA.P. Bio (Ensemble cast with Mary Sohn and Aparna Brielle)What We Do in the Shadows (Protagonist Portrayed by Kayvan Novak)WandaVision (Major starring character portrayed by Randall Park)Doogie Kameāloha, M.D. (Protagonist portrayed by Peyton Elizabeth Lee and ensemble cast with Jason Scott Lee)Amphibia (Protagonist portrayed by Brenda Song)Rutherford Falls (Ensemble cast with Jesse Leigh)Saved by the Bell (Ensemble cast with Josie Totah)Awkwafina Is Nora from Queens (Protagonist portrayed by Awkwafina)Never Have I Ever (Protagonist portrayed by Maitreyi Ramakrishnan)Dash & Lily (co-lead played by Midori Francis)Devs (protagonist portrayed by Sonoya Mizuno)Kim's Convenience (ensemble co-leads played by Simu Liu, Andrea Bang, Paul Sun-Hyung Lee, Jean Yoon)Kung Fu (ensemble cast, Protagonist portrayed by Olivia Liang)Star Trek: Picard (co-lead played by Isa Briones)Yellowstone (main role Kelsey Chow)Zoey's Extraordinary Playlist (ensemble co-leads played by Alice Lee, Kapil Talwalkar)Mythic Quest (Ensemble co-leads played by Danny Pudi, Charlotte Nicdao, Ashly Burch)Shadow and Bone (Protagonists played by Jessie Mei Li and Amita Suman)The Forty-Year-Old Version (lead character's agent is played by Peter Kim)Queens the Series (lead actors are Cindy Chu, Spring Inés Peña, and Carolina Do)High School Musical: The Musical: The Series (main role Olivia Rodrigo)Ms. Marvel (Protagonist portrayed by Iman Vellani and majority of the cast)Sex/Life (Protagonist portrayed by Sarah Shahi)Gossip Girl (Ensemble co-lead played by Evan Mock)Cowboy Bebop (Protagonist portrayed by John Cho)Pandora (Ensemble cast with Banita Sandhu and Akshay Kumar)Here and Now (Ensemble cast with Raymond Lee)Kevin Can F**k Himself (Ensemble cast with Raymond Lee)Quantum Leap'' (Protagonist portrayed by Raymond Lee)

See also 
 Asian Americans in Arts and entertainment
 Portrayal of East Asians in American film and theater
 British television programmes with Asian leads

References

Lists of American television series
Asian-American television